Irene Rousseau (born 1941 Summit, New Jersey) is an American artist. Her work is included in the collections of the Whitney Museum of American Art, The Phillips Collection, the Smithsonian Museum of American Art and the Museum of Modern Art, New York.

References

1941 births
American women printmakers
Living people
20th-century American printmakers
20th-century American women artists
21st-century American printmakers
21st-century American women artists